Murn may refer to:

 Josip Murn, (1879–1901), Slovenian poet
 Murn (river), Bavaria, Germany
 Uroš Murn (born 1975), Slovenian bicycle racer